The Violet Lights are an American indie rock duo formed in  Los Angeles, California in 2011, consisting of Joel Nass and Amber Garvey.  Critics have likened the sound of the band to The Strokes, Arctic Monkeys, The Killers and other Britpop influenced bands, while noting the garage rock elements.

History 

Natives of Green Bay, Wisconsin, Joel Nass and Amber Garvey moved together to Los Angeles before forming The Violet Lights and beginning work on the band's first record, Sex & Sound EP.   Although independently funded and produced, Sex & Sound was recorded at Sunset Sound Recorders in Hollywood, the historic studio where over 200 Gold records have been recorded, including landmark albums by The Rolling Stones, The Beach Boys, and The Doors. The EP has been described as having  particularly high production values and radio-friendly sound for an independent release.

The Violet Lights have been noted for maintaining a unique blog of their experiences as a band, receiving praise for the consistency with which they post and the quality of the accompanying photographs.

Radio

Sex & Sound gained widespread airplay on North American college radio in late 2011, debuting at No. 12 on the CMJ Radio 200 Adds Chart, appearing on the CMJ Radio 200 Chart,  and appearing on the top 30 airplay charts of many college stations.

Tours and Appearances

Buzz generated by Sex & Sound  enabled The Violet Lights to complete a coast-to-coast, two-month tour of North America in early 2012, including performances at the South by Southwest music festival in Austin, Texas in March 2012. The band has played dates with Dead Sara, Cory Chisel and The Wandering Sons, Greg Ginn, and The Bright Light Social Hour.

Discography

EPs
 Sex & Sound (2012)
"Your Love/Not Enough"
"Ready or Not"
"Sex & Sound"
"Substitute"
"It'd be Fine"

Singles
 "New Year's Song" (2013)

See also
Independent music
Underground music
Indie music scene
List of indie rock musicians

References

External links
Official Website

Garage rock groups from California
American musical duos
Indie rock musical groups from California
Musical groups established in 2011
Musical groups from Los Angeles
Rock music duos
2011 establishments in California